"Crazy Gonna Crazy" (stylized as "CRAZY GONNA CRAZY") is a song by Japanese band TRF. The song was released on January 1, 1995 as their 8th single.

Background and release

"Crazy Gonna Crazy" was written and produced by Tetsuya Komuro. "Crazy Gonna Crazy" was released as the theme song to the show Gaman Dekinai! The single first was released on January 1, 1995, and then re-released on November 29, 2006.

Reception
"Crazy Gonna Crazy" peaked at #1 on Oricon Weekly Singles Chart and sold approximately 11.4 million copies combined with "EZ Do Dance."

Track listing

Cover versions

Pretty Rhythm versions

Japanese girl group Prizmmy released a cover of "Crazy Gonna Crazy" as their 9th single on October 30, 2013 in collaboration between Avex Pictures and the Pretty Rhythm franchise to honor TRF's 20th anniversary. The song served as the third opening theme song to the anime series Pretty Rhythm: Rainbow Live. The single charted at #71 on the Oricon Weekly Singles Chart.

Following the release, "Crazy Gonna Crazy" has continued to be featured in the Pretty Rhythm franchise, especially in the King of Prism spin-offs. A version of the song appeared in the film King of Prism: Pride the Hero where it was performed by the characters Shin Ichijo (voiced by Junta Terashima) and Louis Kisaragi (voiced by Shouta Aoi).

References

1995 singles
TRF (group) songs
Anime songs
Avex Group singles
Japanese-language songs
Pretty Rhythm
Songs written by Tetsuya Komuro
Television drama theme songs